Luca Alexandru Florică (born 6 October 2002) is a Romanian professional footballer who plays as a left-back for Liga II side Progresul Spartac București.

Club career

Amiens
In 2019 Florică was transferred by Amiens from Regal Sport București for 200.000 €, but was released after one year.

Hermannstadt
On 16 August 2020, Hermannstadt announced the signing of Florică.

Rapid București
On 10 January 2021, Florică signed a two-and-half-year contract with Romanian club Rapid București.

Academica Clinceni(loan)
On 12 February 2022, Florică joined Liga I club Academica Clinceni on a six-month loan.

Progresul București(loan)
On 1 July 2022, Florică was loaned to Liga II club Progresul București.

Personal life
Luca Florică is the son of businessman Claudiu Florică.

Career statistics

Club

References

External links

2002 births
Living people
Footballers from Bucharest
Romanian footballers
Romania youth international footballers
Association football defenders
Amiens SC players
Liga I players
Liga II players
FC Hermannstadt players
FC Rapid București
LPS HD Clinceni players
AFC Progresul Spartac București players
Romanian expatriate footballers
Expatriate footballers in France
Romanian expatriate sportspeople in France